Chiquilá is a pueblo (village) located in the municipality of Lázaro Cárdenas in the state of Quintana Roo, Mexico, in the extreme northeast of the Yucatán Peninsula. It is located on the coast of the Gulf of Mexico, and its location allows it to be the maritime link to Isla Holbox, an island with a significant tourist influx.

References 

Populated places in Quintana Roo